The Parliamentary Labor Party (also known as the Premiers' Plan Labor Party or Ministerial Labor Party) was a political party active in South Australia from August 1931 until June 1934.

The party came into existence as a result of intense dispute, especially within the Australian Labor Party, about the handling of the response to the Great Depression in Australia. In June 1931, a meeting of state premiers agreed on the Premiers' Plan, which involved sweeping austerity measures combined with increases in revenue. When the Premiers' Plan came up for a vote in South Australia, 23 of Labor's 30 House of Assembly members and two of Labor's four Legislative Council members voted for it. In August 1931, the South Australian state conference of the Labor Party expelled all of the MPs who supported the Premiers' Plan, including Premier Lionel Hill and his entire Cabinet.

Expelled MPs (23) in the House of Assembly: 
Frederick Birrell
Alfred Blackwell
Thomas Butterfield
Clement Collins
George Cooke
Jack Critchley
Bill Denny
Thomas Edwards
Even George
William Harvey
Lionel Hill
Leonard Hopkins
Robert Hunter
Beasley Kearney
Arthur McArthur
Sydney McHugh
John McInnes
John Pedler
Robert Richards
Eric Shepherd
Frank Staniford
Albert Thompson
Walter Warne

Expelled MPs (2) in the Legislative Council: 
James Jelley
Stanley Whitford

Upon the failure of a November appeal to the federal executive of the Labor Party, the expelled MPs definitively constituted themselves as a separate parliamentary party.

Having soundly lost its majority, the PLP ministry stayed in office until the 1933 election with the support of the conservative opposition—the Liberal Federation to 1932 and the Liberal and Country League afterward. Hill, facing increasing political challenges, had himself appointed Agent-General in London and abruptly quit politics in February 1932. Robert Richards briefly succeeded him as Premier, and led the party into the 1933 election.

The party, along with the official Labor Party and the rival splinter Lang Labor Party, performed poorly at the 1933 election. Of the 23 MPs the party had going into the election, only five – Blackwell, McInnes, Pedler, and Richards in the House of Assembly, and Whitford in the Legislative Council, were reelected.  The three Labor factions won only 13 seats between them, against 29 for the LCL.

Two of the three Lang Labor Party MHAs elected at the 1933 state election, Bob Dale and Tom Howard, left the party in 1933 post-election after falling out with leader Doug Bardolph and formed their own party, the South Australian Lang Labor Party (SALLP).

The four Labor parties merged back into the official Labor Party in June 1934 under the leadership of Andrew Lacey of the official Labor faction, following a successful unity conference. Whitford, the party's sole upper house member, had left the party to sit as an independent by the time of the conference, and was not re-admitted.

See also
Australian Labor Party (South Australian Branch)
Members of the South Australian House of Assembly, 1930–1933
Members of the South Australian Legislative Council, 1930–1933
Richards Ministry

References

Defunct political parties in South Australia
Political parties established in 1931
Political parties disestablished in 1934
Politics of South Australia
Australian Labor Party breakaway groups